Gymnosphaera acrostichoides is a species of tree fern found in forests of eastern Indonesia and Papua New Guinea.

Description
The stipe is slender and covered with spines. It is sparsely covered with medium brown scales. Sori cover most of the underside of fertile pinnules. G. acrostichoides lacks indusia.

Distribution and habitat

References

Cyatheaceae
Flora of the Maluku Islands
Flora of New Guinea